The Tatura Football Netball Club, nicknamed the Bulldogs, is an Australian rules football and netball club sited in Tatura, Victoria.

Tatura teams currently compete in the Goulburn Valley League.

Football Premierships
Seniors

VFL / AFL drafted players 
 Bill Heaphy (Essendon 1908-09) 5 games
 Bill Fischer  (Melb 1909) 1 game
 Archie Wilson (Carlton 1910-13) 31 games
 Frank Pritchard (Carlton 1922-23) 20 games
 George Pennicott (St Kilda 1923) 1 game
 Roy Dick (Carlton 1923) 1 game
 Matt Wilkins (Hawthorn 1929) 2 games
 Jack Hunter (Essendon 1940 North Melbourne 1944-45) 9 games
 Bill Pritchard (Geelong 1948-51) 21 games
 Barrie Smith (Carlton 1960) 6 games
 Bruce Baker  (Fitzroy 1969-70) 16 games
 Peter Warburton (Carlton 1971-72) 4 games
 Kevin Payne (Melb Reserves 1977-79)
 Michael Warnett (Melb and Melb Reserves 1982)
 Paul Payne (Melb 1985-88) 28 games
 Chris Chant (Melb Under 19's and Reserves 1984-85)
 Adrian Battiston (Melb 1982-87) (Syd 1988-89) 105 games
 Allister Burke (1989 National Draft - Number 74)
 Garry Merritt (1990 National Draft - Number 19)

References

External links
 Official website

Australian rules football clubs in Victoria (Australia)
Australian rules football clubs established in 1894
1894 establishments in Australia
Goulburn Valley Football League clubs